Craig Gilbert (born November 1, 1956 in Buffalo, New York) is an American former handball player who competed in the 1984 Summer Olympics.

Handball career
When he was at the United States Military Academy, he played for their handball team. He claimed the College Nationals twice.

At West Point, he also played football and basketball.

In 1978, he was elected in the national team.

At the 1984 Summer Olympic Games in Los Angeles, he and the team reached the 9th ranking. He played one game against Denmark.

Military career
He graduated in 1978 with a mechanical engineering degree at the United States Military Academy.

He visited the Airborne School, Ranger School and the United States Army Command and General Staff College.

He served for 6.5 years in South Korea and afterwards he joined the United States Army Reserve.

Gilbert was a reserve liaison officer for 17 years and he recruited candidates for the United States Military Academy.

Between 2004 and 2005 he served in Afghanistan at the Operation Enduring Freedom for this he was promotet as Lieutenant colonel.

Awards and decorations

Academic
Additionally to his time at West Point he also did a master's degree in Steven Institute of Technology and Rutgers University.

References

1956 births
Living people
Sportspeople from Buffalo, New York
American male handball players
Olympic handball players of the United States
Handball players at the 1984 Summer Olympics
Army Black Knights football players
Army Black Knights men's basketball players
Army Black Knights team handball
American men's basketball players